NGC 1261 (also known as Caldwell 87) is a globular cluster of stars in the southern constellation of Horologium, first discovered by Scottish astronomer James Dunlop in 1826. It is about 10.24 billion years old with 341,000 times the mass of the Sun. The cluster does not display the normal indications of core collapse, but evidence suggests it may have instead passed through a post core-collapse bounce state within the past two billion years. The central luminosity density is ·pc−3, which is low for a globular cluster. Despite this, it has a Shapley–Sawyer Concentration Class of II, indicating a dense central concentration.

A total of 22 RR Lyrae variables have been discovered in this cluster, along with two long-period variables, three SX Phoenicis variables, and an eclipsing binary. It was determined to be an Oosterhoff type I cluster, based on the periods of fourteen of the RR Lyrae variables. 18 probable blue straggler candidates have been identified.

References

External links
 
 
SEDS
NASA data
Photometry paper
Globular Clusters Database

Globular clusters
Horologium (constellation)
087b
Astronomical objects discovered in 1826
1261